The Jean K. Freeman Aquatic Center is a venue for competitive swimming at the University of Minnesota in the United States, constructed in 1990. The main competition pool is named after Dorothy L. Sheppard.

References

External links
 Official Site

University of Minnesota
Swimming venues in the United States